Damien Keyeux is a film editor with more than thirty film credits. His credits include The Barons (2009), Illegal (2010), When Pigs Have Wings (2011), Horses of God (2012), Much Loved (2015), and Trainee Day (2016). He received two Magritte Awards for Best Editing for his work in The Marchers (2013) and Mothers' Instinct (2018).

References

External links

Belgian film editors
Living people
Magritte Award winners
Year of birth missing (living people)
Place of birth missing (living people)